The Tournament of Champions is an annual international squash championship held in New York City. In recent years, the event has been held at Grand Central Terminal, in a specially-constructed four-walled glass court in the Vanderbilt Hall.

The tournament was first held in 1930. It was previously known as the US Professional Championships. The women's competition began in 2001. In 2022, the men's tournament has involved a main draw of 24 players, and the women's tournament has had a main draw of 24. The men's event is now part of the PSA World Series.

Past results

Men's finals (since 1993)

Men's champions by country

Men's champions (before 1993) National Professional Squash Racquets Championship

Women's finals 

Note: The women's tournament was inaugurated in 2001

Women's champions by country

References

External links 
 
 SquashTalk section on the Tournament of Champions

 
Sports competitions in New York City
Annual sporting events in the United States
Annual events in New York City
Grand Central Terminal